George Ritchie Dickinson (11 March 1903 – 17 March 1978) was a New Zealand cricketer and rugby union player. He played three tests for the New Zealand cricket team between 1930 and 1932, and five matches for the New Zealand national rugby side, the All Blacks, in 1922.

Early life and family
Born in Dunedin on 11 March 1903, Dickinson was the son of Henry Dickinson and Eliza Jane Dickinson (née McDonald). He was educated at Otago Boys' High School. On 11 June 1929 he married Rua Belle Milne at First Church in Dunedin.

Sporting career

Rugby union
While at Otago Boys' High School, Dickinson played as a five-eighth in the school's 1st XV rugby team between 1918 and 1921. He made his debut for the All Blacks in 1922 on their tour of New South Wales, playing five matches and scoring three tries. Dickinson also played for the South Island in 1922. He retired from first-class rugby at the age of 21.

Cricket
A fast bowler, Dickinson became the first so-called "double All Black" when he represented New Zealand at cricket against Victoria in the 1924–25 season. He played a match against Australia in 1927–28, then in New Zealand's first two official Tests, against England in 1929–30, and a final Test against South Africa in 1931–32. He took eight wickets at an average of 30.62 in his three Tests.

Dickinson played for Otago from 1920–21 to 1937–38, and one match for Wellington in the 1943–44 season. His outstanding performance came in Otago's match against the touring Australians in February 1928, when he dismissed seven of the first eight batsmen, at one stage taking six wickets for three runs in five overs, and finished with figures of 7 for 96. Other notable performances were 6 for 43 and 5 for 46 against Canterbury in 1924–25, and 7 for 90 and 4 for 55 against Wellington the next season. He also scored useful runs in the lower order, with one century, 104, against Wellington in 1927–28.

Working life and death
Dickinson worked as a salesman, store manager, and clerk. He died in Lower Hutt on 17 March 1978, and his ashes were buried at Taitā Lawn Cemetery.

References

1903 births
1978 deaths
Cricketers from Dunedin
People educated at Otago Boys' High School
New Zealand rugby union players
New Zealand international rugby union players
Otago rugby union players
New Zealand cricketers
New Zealand Test cricketers
Pre-1930 New Zealand representative cricketers
Otago cricketers
Wellington cricketers
Burials at Taitā Lawn Cemetery
Rugby union players from Dunedin
South Island cricketers
Rugby union centres